Billy Ray Barnes  (born May 14, 1935) is a former professional American football player and coach.

Early life
Barnes' sports career began at Landis High School where he was a three sport star (baseball, football and basketball) and led his 1953 football team to an undefeated season.

College career
In the fall of 1953, Barnes enrolled at Wake Forest University.

Barnes made the freshman team in 1953 and the varsity team the following year.  As a junior in 1955, he led the team in rushing, punt returns, kickoff returns, pass interceptions and pass receptions, setting the ACC record in pass receptions (31) and yards out of the backfield (349).  After the 1955 football season ended, he joined the baseball team at third base where he hit .319, led the league in stolen bases (17) and helped Wake Forest win the 1955 National Baseball Championship.

In 1956, Barnes became the first player in the ACC to rush for more than 1,000 yards in a single season when he rushed for 1,010 yards.  He was the second leading rusher in the nation, an All-American and 1956 ACC Player of the Year. In 2009, he was inducted into the ACC Football Championship Game Legends Class.

Professional career
Barnes was drafted in the second round of the 1957 NFL Draft by the Philadelphia Eagles.  He made the Pro Bowl his first three years in the league (1957–1959) and was a key member of the backfield during the Eagles' 1960 NFL Championship team.  During the title game against the Green Bay Packers, Barnes ran the ball 13 times for 42 yards.  He had a nine-yard run and key 13-yard pass reception on the game-winning drive, and blocked Packer defensive end Bill Quinlan that helped Ted Dean to score the winning touchdown.

Following the 1961 season, Barnes was traded to the Washington Redskins for center Jim Schrader.  He had two good seasons with the Redskins, leading the team in rushing in 1962.  Barnes was cut by the Redskins before the start of the 1963 season because of an injury he sustained during the pre-season.

In 1965, Barnes returned to the Eagles as a free agent, but was traded to the Minnesota Vikings for a draft choice before the season began.  Barnes retired following the 1966 season, and became head coach of the Continental Football League's Charleston Rockets in 1968.  He eventually became an assistant coach in the NFL, and served as Norm Van Brocklin's backfield coach for the Atlanta Falcons.

Barnes was inducted into the Wake Forest University Hall of Fame in 1975 and the North Carolina Sports Hall of Fame in 1979.

References

1935 births
Living people
American football running backs
Atlanta Falcons coaches
Continental Football League coaches
Minnesota Vikings players
Philadelphia Eagles players
Wake Forest Demon Deacons football players
Washington Redskins players
Eastern Conference Pro Bowl players
People from Landis, North Carolina
Players of American football from North Carolina